Kleinia fulgens is a species of flowering plant in the genus Kleinia and the family Asteraceae which used to be of the genus Senecio.

References

External links

fulgens